Sefid Khani-ye Jadid (also Romanized as Sefīd Khānī-ye Jadīd; also known as Sefīd Khānī and Qaryeh-ye Sefīd Khānī) is a village in Suri Rural District, Suri District, Rumeshkhan County, Lorestan Province, Iran. At the 2006 census, its population was 273, in 58 families.

References 

Populated places in Rumeshkhan County